C. armeniaca may refer to:

 Consolida armeniaca, a plant species
 Cypraea armeniaca, a snail species in the genus Cypraea

See also
 Armeniaca (disambiguation)